The Octopoteuthidae are a family of squid comprising two genera. The family is characterized by tentacles which cease to grow after the paralarval stage, and the use of a penis, instead of a hectocotylus.

Species
Genus Octopoteuthis
Octopoteuthis danae
Octopoteuthis deletron
Octopoteuthis indica *
Octopoteuthis longiptera
Octopoteuthis megaptera
Octopoteuthis nielseni
Octopoteuthis rugosa
Octopoteuthis sicula, Ruppell's octopus squid
Genus Taningia
Taningia danae, Dana octopus squid
Taningia persica *

The species listed above with an asterisk (*) are questionable and need further study to determine if they are a valid species or a synonym.

References

External links

Octopoteuthidae discussion forum at TONMO.com
Tree of Life web project: Octopoteuthidae

Squid
Cephalopod families